The Henry Cow discography is a list of officially released recordings by English avant-rock group Henry Cow. During their period of activity from 1968 to 1978, they released six albums, including two with German/English avant-pop trio Slapp Happy, and one double live album. The album Hopes and Fears (1978) was credited to the Art Bears but has been described as "the lost Henry Cow album". Hopes and Fears was originally recorded as a Henry Cow album, but when some of the band members were unhappy about the predominance of song-oriented material over instrumentals, it was released under the Art Bears name.

In 2006 Recommended Records, founded by Henry Cow drummer Chris Cutler. released a 7-CD box set, the Henry Cow Box comprising CD remasters of the original six albums. In 2009, to mark the anniversary of the formation of Henry Cow, Recommended Records released a 9-CD plus one DVD box set, The 40th Anniversary Henry Cow Box Set that contained previously unreleased recordings made between 1972 and 1978. The DVD, a 75-minute video of Henry Cow performing in Vevey, Switzerland in August 1976, is the only known video recording of the band.

In 2019, to mark Henry Cow's 50th anniversary, Recommended Records released The Henry Cow Box Redux: The Complete Henry Cow, an 17-CD plus one DVD box set containing all officially released recordings of the band.

Studio albums

Live albums

Box sets

Other albums 
Albums with, or by, other artists containing previously unreleased Henry Cow tracks.

Keys 
   – The highlighted albums are the six definitive albums Henry Cow made during their existence.

Footnotes

References 

Discography
Discographies of British artists
Rock music group discographies
Canterbury scene